In Hawaiian mythology, Welaʻahilaninui (“Wela’ahilani the Great”) was a god or the first man, the forefather of Hawaiians. He is mentioned as an ancestor of Hawaiian chiefs in the ancient Hawaiian chant Kumulipo.

Etymology 
Wela’ahilaninui’s name can also be spelled as Wela-Ahi-Lani-Nui. Wela means “heat” or “lust”, whilst ahi means “fire”. Lani is a word for sky. Nui means “the great”.

An alternative (or secondary semantic layer) to “fire” is “one”, or “first” as with kahi. This is possible through a phenomenon known in linguistics as t-glottalization or glottal replacement, which occurs when the letter “t” shifts to become the glottal stop, or okina. This is a pattern frequently seen in many languages, such as the Cockney form of the English language  While “kahi” does not have an onset “t”, it should be recognized that “kahi” and, from the Samoan language, “tasi” share a common origin as both mean “one”, or “first”.

Thus Wela-Kahi-Lani-Nui may allude to “the great, original burning fire in the heavens”.

Family 
Wela’ahilaninui’s wife was called Owe. Their son was Kahiko, who fathered Wākea the Sky father.

Wela’ahilaninui’s parents were Iwahinakiʻiakea (son of Hikiuanahina by Waluanahina) and his consort Lohanakiʻipapa (Umiwahinakiʻipapa), whose parents are not known.

Mythology 
There are many Hawaiian traditions of how people obtained fire. According to one, fire was obtained in the time of Welaahilaninui. This is related to his very name.

Abraham Fornander mentioned that Welaahilaninui and his wife were the first couple of humans. They were created by the great gods Lono, Kāne and Kū.

Notes 

Year of death unknown
Ancient Hawaiian royalty
Hawaiian gods
Legendary progenitors
Year of birth unknown